Ricardo Bones (born April 7, 1969) is a Puerto Rican former professional baseball pitcher and bullpen coach for the Washington Nationals of Major League Baseball (MLB). He played from 1991 to 2001 for three National League teams – the San Diego Padres, Cincinnati Reds, and Florida Marlins – and four American League teams – the Milwaukee Brewers, Kansas City Royals, New York Yankees, and Baltimore Orioles.

Career

Playing career

Bones was signed by the Padres as an amateur free agent on May 13, 1986, making his MLB debut on August 11, 1991, against the Cincinnati Reds. He pitched seven innings, allowed only 2 hits, and received his first professional victory.

On March 26, 1992, Bones was traded with Matt Mieske and José Valentín to the Milwaukee Brewers for Gary Sheffield and minor league player Geoff Kellogg. He stayed with the Brewers for more than 4 seasons. His best season arguably was in 1994 when he won 10 games, losing 9, with a 3.43 ERA in 170 innings. On August 29, 1996, he was traded by the Brewers to the New York Yankees with Pat Listach and Graeme Lloyd for Bob Wickman and Gerald Williams. He only played four games with the Yankees before being granted free agency on October 25. After that, he started moving from team to team playing with the Cincinnati Reds, the Brewers again, Kansas City Royals, Minnesota Twins, Baltimore Orioles, and Florida Marlins. On June 19, 1998, Bones picked up the only save of his major league career. He pitched 4 scoreless innings to close out a 8-4 Royals victory over the Tigers. He saved the game for starter Glendon Rusch. On November 5, 2001, he was granted free agency by the Marlins and he chose to retire.

Coaching career
Bones was the pitching coach for the Binghamton Mets and the Buffalo Bisons.

Bones was the New York Mets bullpen coach from the 2012 to 2018 seasons.

During the 2013 World Baseball Classic, Bones served as pitching coach for the Puerto Rico national baseball team.

On June 20, 2019, Bones once again became the bullpen coach for the New York Mets when Chuck Hernandez was fired. Bones was among several coaches who were granted by the Mets to pursue other coaching opportunities in the MLB following the 2021 season.

On November 4, 2021, Bones was hired by the Washington Nationals to serve as the team's bullpen coach for the 2022 season.

Mitchell Report

Bones was named in the Mitchell report for taking performance-enhancing drugs (PEDs).

See also
 List of Major League Baseball players from Puerto Rico
 List of Major League Baseball players named in the Mitchell Report

References

External links

1969 births
Living people
American League All-Stars
Baltimore Orioles players
Charleston Rainbows players
Cincinnati Reds players
Edmonton Trappers players
Florida Marlins players
Kansas City Royals players
Las Vegas 51s players
Las Vegas Stars (baseball) players
Major League Baseball bullpen coaches
Major League Baseball pitchers
Major League Baseball pitching coaches
Major League Baseball players from Puerto Rico
Milwaukee Brewers players
Minor league baseball coaches
New York Mets coaches
New York Yankees players
Omaha Royals players
People from Salinas, Puerto Rico
Puerto Rican expatriate baseball players in Canada
Riverside Red Wave players
Salt Lake Buzz players
San Diego Padres players
Spokane Indians players
Tucson Toros players
Wichita Wranglers players
Washington Nationals coaches